Ergotelis Football Academy is the football academy system of Greek professional football club Ergotelis. It is the largest youth sports academy on the island of Crete, hosting over 40 age-based boys' and girls' football departments, and one of the largest in Greece, registering over 900 children and adolescents aged 6−21 years old. The Academy currently maintains various competitive departments, including the club's official youth team (Under-19), as well as an additional other 3 age-based sister clubs, all subsidiaries to the Gymnastics Club Ergotelis (Neoi Ergoteli, Kanaria Ergoteli, Martinengo). Ergotelis' U19 team currently plays in the Greek Football League's youth competition (Football League U19), while the other three teams participate at various levels of the Heraklion Football Clubs Association League system.

Academy Personnel 

As of 23 July 2018

Ergotelis U-19 
Ergotelis U−19  is the official U−19 youth team of Ergotelis. They currently play in the Greek Football League's youth competition (Football League U19).

Squad 
 P.  Players with professional contract.

Personnel 
As of 23 January 2020

Neoi Ergoteli

Neoi Ergoteli (transliterated Ergotelis' Youth) is a sister club to Ergotelis and a subsidiary to the parent sports club of the same name. It acts as an unofficial reserve team to Ergotelis U−19. They compete in the regional Heraklion FCA A2 Division, the second tier of the regional League system, and by the club board's decision, are ineligible for promotion.

Squad 
As of 23 January 2020

Kanaria Ergoteli 

Kanaria Ergoteli (transliterated Ergotelis' Canaries) is a sister club to Ergotelis and a subsidiary to the parent sports club of the same name. It was founded in 1995,. After several years inactive, the club reverted to full operation in 2015. It acts as an unofficial U−17 youth team. They compete in the regional Heraklion FCA B Division, the third tier of the regional League system, and by the club board's decision, are ineligible for promotion.

Squad 
As of 23 January

Martinengo 

Martinengo (named after the Martinengo bastion on top of which the Ergotelis Athletic Centre is located) is a sister club to Ergotelis and a subsidiary to the parent sports club of the same name. It is the most recent football department established by the club, founded in 2016 to act as an unofficial U−15 youth team. They compete in the regional Heraklion FCA C Division, the fourth tier of the regional League system, and by the club board's decision, are ineligible for promotion.

Squad 
As of 23 January 2020

Nees Ergoteli

Nees Ergoteli (transliterated Ergotelis' Youth) is a sister club to Ergotelis Women's Soccer and a subsidiary to the parent sports club of the same name. It acts as a reserve team to Ergotelis. They compete in the Gamma Ethniki, the third tier of the Greek women's football league system.

Squad 
As of 24 April 2019

Former Academy Players 

Greece
 Andreas Bouchalakis
 Antonis Bourselis
 Bruno Chalkiadakis
 Christos Chrysofakis
 Alkis Dimitris
 Giannis Domatas
 Giannis Iatroudis
 Nikos Karelis 
 Zacharias Kavousakis 
 Leonardo Koutris
 Chrysovalantis Kozoronis
 Manolis Moniakis
 Epaminondas Pantelakis
 Georgios Sarris
 Manolis Tzanakakis
 Manolis Saliakas

Albania
 Albi Alla

Serbia
 Nikola Stojanović
||

References

Ergotelis F.C.
Football clubs in Heraklion
Football clubs in Crete
Football academies in Greece